Ladislav Chmelík is a Grand Prix motorcycle racer from Czech Republic. He is currently competing in the Superstock 600 FIM Europe Championship for DRT Racing Team aboard a Yamaha YZF-R6.

Career statistics

By season

Races by year

References

External links
 Profile on motogp.com

Czech motorcycle racers
Living people
125cc World Championship riders
Year of birth missing (living people)